Chaeron (Ancient Greek: Χαίρων)—also rendered Charon—was an ancient Greek male name. It may refer to:

Chaeron, in Greek mythology, the son of Apollo and Thero
Chaeron of Megalopolis, sent by Philip II of Macedon to consult the Delphic oracle about a snake from a peculiar dream
Chaeron of Pellene, wrestler and tyrant
Chaeron of Sparta, demagogue who served as tyrant of Sparta in 180 BC